Hotepsekhemwy is the Horus name of an early Egyptian king who was the founder of the Second Dynasty of Egypt. The exact length of his reign is not known; the Turin canon suggests an improbable 95 years while the ancient Egyptian historian Manetho reports that the reign of "Boëthôs" lasted for 38 years. Egyptologists consider both statements to be misinterpretations or exaggerations. They credit Hotepsekhemwy with either a 25- or a 29-year rule.<ref>Dietrich Wildung: Die Rolle ägyptischer Könige im Bewusstsein ihrer Nachwelt. Teil 1: Posthume Quellen über die Könige der ersten vier Dynastien; Münchener Ägyptologische Studien, Volume 17. Deutscher Kunstverlag, München/Berlin, 1969. page 31-33.</ref>

 Name sources 

Hotepsekhemwy's name has been identified by archaeologists at Sakkara, Giza, Badari and Abydos from clay seal impressions, stone vessels and bone cylinders. Several stone vessel inscriptions mention Hotepsekhemwy along with the name of his successor Raneb.Guy Brunton: Qau and Badari I, with chapters by Alan Gardiner and Flinders Petrie, British School of Archaeology in Egypt 44, London 1927: Bernard Quaritch, Tafel XIX, 25Eva-Maria Engel: Die Siegelabrollungen von Hetepsechmui und Raneb aus Saqqara. In: Ernst Czerny, Irmgard Hein, Hermann Hunger, Dagmar Melman, Angela Schwab: Timelines: Studies in Honour of Manfred Bietak. Peeters, Leuven 2006, page 28–29.

The Horus name of Hotepsekhemwy is the subject of particular interest to Egyptologists and historians, as it may hint at the turbulent politics of the time. The Egyptian word "Hotep" means "peaceful" and "to be pleased" though it can also mean "conciliation" or "to be reconciled", too. So Hotepsekhemwy's full name may be read as "the two powers are reconciled" or "pleasing in powers", which suggests a significant political meaning. In this sense, "the two powers" could be a reference to Upper Egypt and Lower Egypt as well as to the major deities Horus and Seth.

From the reign of Hotepsekhemwy onward it became a tradition to write the Horus name and the Nebty name in the same way. It is thought that some kind of philosophic background affected that choice, since the Horus name reveals a clearly defined, symbolic meaning in its translation. Horus- and nebty names being the same might also indicate, that the Horus name was adopted after ascending the throne.

 Family 
The name of Hotepsekhemwy's wife is unknown. A “son of the king” and “priest of Sopdu” named Perneb might have been his son, but since the clay seals providing his name and titles were found in a gallery tomb which is attributed to two kings equally (Hotepsekhemwy and his successor, Raneb), it is uncertain whose son Perneb really was.Peter Kaplony: Inschriften der Ägyptischen Frühzeit. Band 3, (= Ägyptologische Abhandlungen Bd. 8). Harrassowitz, Wiesbaden 1963, page 96 as Obj. 367.

 Identity 

Hotepsekhemwy is commonly identified with the Ramesside cartouche names Bedjau from the Abydos king list, Bedjatau from Giza, Netjer-Bau from the Sakkara king list and the name Bau-hetepju from the royal canon of Turin. Egyptologist Wolfgang Helck points to the similar name Bedjatau, which appears in a short king list found on a writing board from the mastaba tomb G1001 of the high official Mesdjeru. "Bedjatau" means "the foundryman" and is thought to be a misreading of the name "Hotepsekhemwy", since the hieroglyphic signs used to write "Hotep" in its full form are very similar to the signs of a pottery kiln and a chick in hieratic writings. The signs of two Sekhem sceptres were misread as a leg and a drill. A similar phenomenon might have occurred in the case of King Khasekhemwy, where the two sceptres in the Horus name were misread as two leg-symbols or two drill-signs. The Abydos king list imitates this Old Kingdom name form of “Bedjatau”. The names "Netjerbau" and "Bau-hetepju" are problematic, since Egyptologists can't find any name source from Hotepsekhemwy's time that could have been used to form them.Edward Brovarski: Two Old Kingdom writing boards from Giza. In: Annales du Service des Antiquités de l´Egypte, Vol.71, 1987, Table 1

 Reign 
Little is known about Hotepsekhemwy's reign. Contemporary sources show that he may have gained the throne after a period of political strife, including ephemeral rulers such as Horus Bird and Sneferka (the latter is also thought to be an alternate name used by king Qaa for a short time). As evidence of this, Egyptologists Wolfgang Helck, Dietrich Wildung and George Reisner point to the tomb of king Qaa, which was plundered at the end of 1st Dynasty and was restored during the reign of Hotepsekhemwy. The plundering of the cemetery and the unusually conciliatory meaning of the name Hotepsekhemwy may be clues of a dynastic struggle. Additionally, Helck assumes that the kings Sneferka and Horus Bird were omitted from later king lists because their struggles for the Egyptian throne were factors in the collapse of the first dynasty.Peter Kaplony: „Er ist ein Liebling der Frauen“ – Ein „neuer“ König und eine neue Theorie zu den Kronprinzen sowie zu den Staatsgöttinnen (Kronengöttinnen) der 1./2. Dynastie. In: Manfred Bietak: Ägypten und Levante. Verlag der Österreichischen Akademie der Wissenschaften, Wien 2006 ; page 126–127.

Seal impressions provide evidence of a new royal residence called "Horus the shining star" that was constructed by Hotepsekhemwy. He also built a temple near Buto for the little-known deity Netjer-Achty and founded the "Chapel of the White Crown". The white crown is a symbol of Upper Egypt. This is thought to be another clue to the origin of Hotepsekhemwy's dynasty, indicating a likely source of political power.Toby A. H. Wilkinson: Early Dynastic Egypt. Routledge, London 1999, page 285 & 286. Egyptologists such as Nabil Swelim point out that there is no inscription from Hotepsekhemwy's reign mentioning a Sed festival, indicating the ruler cannot have ruled longer than 30 years (the Sed festival was celebrated as the anniversary marking a reign of 30 years).

The ancient Egyptian historian Manetho called Hotepsekhemwy Boëthôs (apparently altered from the name Bedjau) and reported that during this ruler's reign "a chasm opened near Bubastis and many perished". Although Manetho wrote in the 3rd century BC – over two millennia after the king's actual reign – some Egyptologists think it possible that this anecdote may have been based on fact, since the region near Bubastis is known to be seismically active.

 Tomb 
The location of Hotepsekhemwy's tomb is unknown. Egyptologists such as Flinders Petrie, Alessandro Barsanti and Toby Wilkinson believe it could be the giant underground Gallery Tomb A beneath the funeral passage of the Unas-necropolis at Saqqara. Many seal impressions of king Hotepsekhemwy have been found in these galleries.

Egyptologists such as Wolfgang Helck and Peter Munro are not convinced and think that Gallery Tomb B'' is instead the burial site of king Raneb, as several seal impressions of this ruler were also found there.

The more accepted theory is that Hotepsekhemwy and his son Raneb shared Tomb A.

References

External links
 Francesco Raffaele: Hotepsekhemwy - Hotep

29th-century BC Pharaohs
Pharaohs of the Second Dynasty of Egypt
3rd-millennium BC births
3rd-millennium BC deaths